Dhaakad is a 2022 Indian Hindi-language action film directed by Razneesh Ghai. It stars Kangana Ranaut, Arjun Rampal, Divya Dutta and Saswata Chatterjee.

However the movie became one of the biggest box office bomb bollywood ever produced despite Ranaut's huge social media following.

Plot
Agent Agni is an International Task Force (ITF) officer, who is ruthless in her tactics of handling terrorists and criminals. Agni is an orphan, whose parents were killed by an assassin when she was a child. She is then raised by an ITF officer. Agni is sent to Budapest to gather details about a arms trafficking and human trafficking racket. As per the information collected by her, the mastermind of the racket is Rudraveer and his partner, Rohini. Rudraveer is a mysterious character, who operates from Sohagpur Coal Fields near Bhopal, India. Agni is sent to collect information on Rudraveer so that he can be nabbed. Although hesitant at first, as her parents died in India, Agni goes ahead. She does not realize that she is going through with the toughest mission of her career. What happens forms the rest of the plot.

Cast 
 Kangana Ranaut as Agent Agni
 Arjun Rampal as Rudraveer
 Divya Dutta as Rohini
 Saswata Chatterjee as Handler
 Sharib Hashmi as Fazal
 Tumul Balyan as Pratap
 Gabriel Georgiou as Shamsher
 Siddhant Shukla as Traitor
 Gyula Mesterhazy as Fyodor
 Daniel Viktor Nagy as Sheikh
 Mihir Ahuja as young Rudraveer
 Sejal Jaiswal as Agni's Mother

Production

Development
Dhaakad was announced on 20 October 2020. Kangana shared her various looks from the film. Kangana wrote on Instagram, "She is fierce, feisty and fearless. #AgentAgni is all geared up to set the big screen on fire. In an interview Kangana said, "Dhaakad is not only a benchmark film for my career but will be a turning point for Indian cinema as well. The film is mounted on a large scale, and is one of a kind female-led action film."

Training
The actors appearing in the film as Agents, including Ranaut, underwent training in action flick for over three months.

Filming
Principal photography began on 15 January 2021. It has been shot in Betul, Madhya Pradesh and Budapest. Razneesh Razy Ghai, the director of the film wrote on his Instagram account, "The producers and I were insistent that we hire key members of the team from other film industries. When you want your film to have high-octane action, you have to go above and beyond. For key sequences, we roped in action directors from the United States, South Korea, Canada and South Africa. Hitz international action specialists, as well as Cameron Hilts and Sea-young Oh. The Indian stunt team was on par with our international collaborators." The filming was completed on 8 July 2021.

Soundtrack

The film's soundtrack is composed by Shankar–Ehsaan–Loy and Dhruv Ghanekar while the lyrics are written by Amitabh Bhattacharya and Ishitta Arun.

Release

Theatrical 
Dhaakad was released theatrically on 20 May 2022 along with Kartik Aaryan starrer Bhool Bhulaiyaa 2. The film was initially scheduled for a Diwali (November) 2020 release but due to the COVID-19 pandemic the film got postponed. The film was postponed again and a new release date, 8 April 2022, was announced on 18 October 2021.

Distribution 
The film was distributed by Zee Studios.

Home media 
The film premiered on 1 July 2022 on ZEE5 under subscription but, during the ZEE5 Manoranjan Festival it was made free on air till 1st January, 2023.

Reception 
 

Shalini Langer of The Indian Express rated the film 3.5 out of 5 stars and wrote "A slick action film that is also coherent – Kangana Ranaut-Divya Dutta-Arjun Rampal film is an achievement". Rachana Dubey of The Times Of India rated the film 3 out of 5 stars and wrote "It would have been great if along with the superb action and terrific visuals, the story, too, could have packed a punch". Sonil Dedhia of News 18 rated the film 3 out of 5 stars and wrote "Kangana Ranaut's solid performance in 'Dhaakad' combined with high-impact stunt work puts a stamp on her as a formidable female action star". Pooja Biraia Jaiswal of The Week rated the film 3 out of 5 stars and wrote "Dhaakad is a popcorn film; an almost-edge-of-the-seat action thriller led by an able cast, spectacular action sequences and meticulous execution". Nandini Ramnath of Scroll.in rated the film 2 out of 5 stars and wrote "Dhaakad makes little effort to credibly localise its themes". 

Bharathi Pradhan of Lehren rated the film 1.5 out of 5 stars and wrote "Dhaakad is singularly unimaginative in its presentation and execution". Anna M.M. Vetticad of Firstpost rated the film 0.5 out of 5 stars and wrote "Dhaakad is marred by extremely violent scenes, vacuous writing, dull direction and is boring-as-hell". Sukanya Verma of Rediff rated the film 2 out of 5 stars and wrote "Kangana Ranaut ticks off all the boxes of the poker-faced spy model in Dhakaad, but the movie needs real rescuing". Swati Chopra of The Quint rated the film 1 out of 5 and wrote, "Dhaakad's stunt choreography and camera work by Tetsua Nahata is impressive and that's what makes the film somewhat bearable." Bollywood Hungama called Dhaakad a "disastrous flop at the box office". It rated the film 1.5 out of 5 stars and wrote "The Kangana Ranaut starrer DHAAKAD is all style and no substance and fails to deliver entertainment value".

Box office
Dhaakad was a major box office disaster, with most of its shows discontinued from cinemas within one week of release.

References

External links 
 
 

2020s Hindi-language films
2022 films
2022 action films
Indian action films
Films shot in Budapest
Films postponed due to the COVID-19 pandemic
Films shot in Madhya Pradesh
Hindi-language action films